This is a list of books in the English language which deal with Germany and its geography, history, inhabitants, culture, biota, etc.

 Algan, Yann, et al. "The economic situation of first and second‐generation immigrants in France, Germany and the United Kingdom." (2010): F4-F30. online
 Kogan, Irena. "New immigrants―old disadvantage patterns? Labour market integration of recent immigrants into Germany." International Migration 49.1 (2011): 91–117. online
 Coy, Jason. A brief history of Germany (2021) online .
 Craig, Gordon A. Germany, 1866-1945 (Clarendon Press, 1978).
 d’Amuri, Francesco, Gianmarco IP Ottaviano, and Giovanni Peri. "The labor market impact of immigration in Western Germany in the 1990s." European Economic Review 54.4 (2010): 550–570. online
 Dauth, Wolfgang, Sebastian Findeisen, and Jens Suedekum. "Trade and manufacturing jobs in Germany." American Economic Review 107.5 (2017): 337–342. online
 Dustmann, Christian, et al. "From sick man of Europe to economic superstar: Germany's resurgent economy." Journal of economic perspectives 28.1 (2014): 167–188. online
 
 Funk, Nanette. "A spectre in Germany: refugees, a ‘welcome culture’ and an ‘integration politics’." in Refugee Crisis (Routledge, 2018) pp. 44-54. online
 Grix, Jonathan, and Barrie Houlihan. "Sports mega-events as part of a nation's soft power strategy: The cases of Germany (2006) and the UK (2012)." British journal of politics and international relations 16.4 (2014): 572–596. online
 Haas, Tobias. "From green energy to the green car state? The political economy of ecological modernisation in Germany." New political economy 26.4 (2021): 660–673.
 Hardach, Karl. The political economy of Germany in the twentieth century (Univ of California Press, 2022).
 Hearnden, Arthur. Education, Culture, and Politics in West Germany (Elsevier, 2014).
 Jackson, Gregory, and Arndt Sorge. "The trajectory of institutional change in Germany, 1979–2009." in Changing Models of Capitalism in Europe and the US (Routledge, 2016) pp. 38–59 online.
 
 Samuel, Richard H., and R. Hinton Thomas. Education and society in modern Germany (Routledge, 2013).
 Schlösser, Hans Jürgen, Michael Schuhen, and Susanne Schürkmann. "The acceptance of the social market economy in Germany." Citizenship, Social and Economics Education 16.1 (2017): 3–18. online
 Shen, Lihua, and Yanran Hong. "Can geopolitical risks excite Germany economic policy uncertainty: Rethinking in the context of the Russia-Ukraine conflict." Finance Research Letters 51 (2023): 103420. online
 Sleifer, Jaap. Planning ahead and falling behind: the East German economy in comparison with West Germany 1936-2002 (Walter de Gruyter 2014). online
 Triadafilopoulos, Triadafilos. Becoming multicultural: Immigration and the politics of membership in Canada and Germany (UBC Press, 2012) online.

Germany
German studies